Ctidružice is a municipality and village in Znojmo District in the South Moravian Region of the Czech Republic. It has about 300 inhabitants.

History
The first written mention of Ctidružice is from 1365.

References

Villages in Znojmo District